The Civil Servant is a 1931 Soviet film directed by Ivan Pyryev.

Plot 
The film tells about the cashier Apollo Fokine, who works on the board of the railway and became the object of the attack of the wrecking group. He resists, and while sakoyazh with money suddenly turns up under the stairs and Fokine with the help of his wife gets the opportunity to take the money himself.

Starring 
 Maksim Shtraukh as Apollon Fokin
 Lidiya Nenasheva as Fokina
 Naum Rogozhin as Razverzayev
 Leonid Yurenev as Fon Mekk
 Aleksandr Antonov as Chairman
 Ivan Bobrov as Russian
 Tatyana Barysheva as Nun
 Natalya Vasilyeva

References

External links 

1931 films
1930s Russian-language films
Soviet black-and-white films
Soviet comedy films
1931 comedy films